Propaganda in Spain has a long history, and in the modern times has been studied in the context of the propaganda of the Spanish Civil War and propaganda of the Francoist Spain (1939-1975).

See also 

 Mottos of Francoist Spain
 Propaganda of the Spanish–American War

References